The 1997 ARDC AMSCAR Sedan Series was an Australian touring car series and was run for cars eligible to V8 Supercar specifications, although the series was not sanctioned by AVESCO. It began on 22 June 1997 at Eastern Creek Raceway and ended on 7 December at Eastern Creek Raceway after four rounds.

The series was run by the Australian Racing Drivers Club (ARDC) over the two circuits operated by the club in Sydney, Australia. It was the last such series to bear the AMSCAR name having been last run previously during the 1994 season. The series itself dated back to the Amaroo Park-based Sun-7 Chesterfield Series of the 1970s.

The 1997 series can be seen as the immediate fore-runner for today's Dunlop V8 Supercar Series, acting as a second tier series for touring cars contested by privately owned and funded touring car teams, known colloquially as 'privateers'.

Teams and drivers
The following drivers and teams competed in the 1997 AMSCAR series. The series consisted of four rounds.

Results and standings

Race calendar
The 1997 AMSCAR season consisted of 4 rounds.

Drivers Championship
Points were allocated 18–14–11–9–7–5–4–3–2–1 according to top ten race position in each race with three races being held per round.

References

External links
 1997 Racing Results Archive

Supercars Championship
ARDC AMSCAR series
ARDC